Mosfilmovskaya Street (romanised: Mosfílmovskaya úlitsa), formerly also Potylikha Street, is a street in Ramenki District, West Administrative District, Moscow, where the Mosfilm Studios and many foreign embassies are located.

The name Mosfilmovskaya was officially adopted in 1939. Being outside the Garden Ring (Садовое Кольцо), which encircles central Moscow, the street runs south-west across a residential area between the Moskva River and its tributary Setun River (Сетунь). Moscow's Sparrow Hills (known as Lenin Hills during the Soviet era) are quite close here.

Around the 17th century the area was known as the estate of Troitskoye-Golenishchevo (another name being Golenishchevo-Kutuzovo), a country seat of the Kutuzov family, whose prominent descendant, Russian field marshal Mikhail Illarionovich Kutuzov (1745-1813) fought Napoleon I of France during Patriotic War of 1812. A major landmark surviving from that time is the Trinity Church (1644–45).

Notable buildings 
 1 - Mosfilm Studios
 18а — Holy Trinity Church 
 38 - People's Bureau of Libya
 44 - Embassy of Kuwait
 46 - Embassy of Serbia
 50 - Embassy of Malaysia
 50 bld.1 - Embassy of Bosnia and Herzegovina
 50 bld.1 - Embassy of Nicaragua
 50 bld.1 - Embassy of Panama
 56 - Embassy of Germany
 60 - Embassy of Sweden
 62 - Embassy of Hungary
 64 - Embassy of Romania
 66 - Embassy of Bulgaria
 72 - Embassy of North Korea

The embassies of Angola and the United Arab Emirates are located nearby, in Ulofa Palme Street. The embassy of the People's Republic of China is located at 6 Druzhby Street, within a ten-minute walk from Mosfilmovskaya Street.

Image gallery

Images of embassies

External links 
Satellite picture by Google Maps

Streets in Moscow
Mosfilm